Halloween III: Season of the Witch is a 1982 American science fiction horror film and the third installment in the Halloween film series. It is the first film to be written and directed by Tommy Lee Wallace. John Carpenter and Debra Hill, the creators of Halloween and Halloween II, return as producers. Halloween III is the only entry in the series that does not feature the series antagonist, Michael Myers. After the film's disappointing reception and box office performance, Michael Myers was brought back six years later in Halloween 4: The Return of Michael Myers.

The film departs from the slasher genre of the other installments, instead featuring a "witchcraft" theme with science fiction aspects. John Carpenter and Debra Hill believed that the Halloween series could have been an anthology series of films that centered around Halloween night, with each sequel containing its own characters, setting, and storyline. Director Wallace stated there were many ideas for Halloween-themed films, some of which could have potentially created any number of their own sequels, and that Season of the Witch was meant to be the first.

As with the series' other films, suspense and tension are key themes, exploring violence against young children. On a budget of $2.5 million, Halloween III made a profit by grossing $14.4 million at the box office in the US, but it was also the poorest performing film in the Halloween series at the time. Most critics gave the film negative reviews. Despite the reception, re-evaluation in later years has given Halloween III new legions of fans and has established its own reputation as a stand-alone cult film.

It was the last Halloween film distributed by Universal Pictures until the 2018 film Halloween 36 years later. It is also Maidie Norman's final film before her death in 1998.

Plot 
On October 23, 1982, in Northern California, shop owner Harry Grimbridge is pursued by mysterious men in suits, with a jack-o-lantern Halloween mask in his possession. He collapses at the shop of Walter Jones, who calls for help. Harry is taken to a hospital and placed in the care of Dr. Daniel Challis, an alcoholic doctor who has a strained relationship with his ex-wife and two children. Later that night, Harry is murdered by another suited man, who immolates himself in his car. After identifying his body, Harry's daughter Ellie meets Daniel to talk about the suspicious events surrounding Harry's death. They decide to investigate and travel to Santa Mira, California, hometown to the Silver Shamrock Novelties factory, which made the Halloween mask that Harry carried the night of his death. As they check in to a motel, Daniel learns that Harry had stayed there in the past.

Marge Guttman, another motel customer, discovers a microchip on the back of the medallion of one of the masks. The medallion emits a deadly energy beam into her mouth as she picks at it curiously with a hairpin. Her face is left mutilated, and an insect crawls out of her mouth. Shortly after, men in lab coats take Marge's body away in a Silver Shamrock van. Daniel overhears the factory technicians describing a “misfire” to factory owner Conal Cochran. While Daniel and Ellie tour the factory the following morning, Ellie finds her father's car, guarded by more men in suits who stop her from getting closer to it. They attempt to call the authorities as they flee, but Daniel cannot reach anyone outside of town by phone. Ellie is kidnapped and taken to the factory; Daniel follows and is captured by the men in suits, revealed to be androids Cochran created.

Cochran takes Daniel to the "final processing" control room and reveals his plan: the microchip on each mask contains a fragment of Stonehenge that he stole. Upon viewing the "Big Giveaway" commercial, the microchips on the masks activate, killing the wearer with brain damage and releasing a swarm of insects and snakes that kill anyone nearby.

Cochran locks a mask-clad Daniel in a room and explains his plan to resurrect ancient rituals from his native Celtic lands, sacrificing children at Samhain, the pagan celebration of the coming winter. Daniel escapes his bonds and rescues Ellie. He sneaks into the control room, activates the commercial on the screens, and pours a box of the medallions from a ceiling rafter, killing everyone. The Stonehenge remnant kills Cochran and a massive fire destroys the factory. As they flee, Daniel is attacked by Ellie, who is actually an android replacement, which he destroys after a struggle and car crash. He flees on foot to Walter's shop and frantically contacts television networks, attempting to stop the commercial broadcast. He succeeds with two networks, but fails with a third, despite screaming into the telephone, pleading with them to stop.

Cast

Dick Warlock, who played Michael Myers in Halloween II, played the android Assassin.

Production

When approached about creating a third Halloween film, original Halloween writers John Carpenter and Debra Hill were reluctant to pledge commitment. Carpenter and Hill agreed to participate in the new project only if it was not a direct sequel to Halloween II, which meant Michael Myers would not be the focus of the film. Irwin Yablans and Moustapha Akkad, who had produced the first two films, gave Halloween III a budget of $2.5 million.

Special effects artist Don Post of Post Studios designed the latex masks in the film which included a glow-in-the-dark skull, a lime-green witch and an orange Day-Glo jack-o'-lantern. Hill told Aljean Harmetz, "We didn't exactly have a whole lot of money for things like props, so we asked Post, who had provided The Shape mask for the earlier 'Halloween' [II] ... , if we could work out a deal." The skull and witch masks were adaptations of standard Post Studios masks, but the jack-o'-lantern was created specifically for Halloween III. Post linked the masks of the film to the popularity of masks in the real world:

Every society in every time has had its masks that suited the mood of the society, from the masked ball to clowns to makeup. People want to act out a feeling inside themselves—angry, sad, happy, old. It may be a sad commentary on present-day America that horror masks are the best sellers.

Most of the filming took place on location in the small coastal town of Loleta, California. Familiar Foods, a milk bottling plant in Loleta, served as the Silver Shamrock Novelties factory, but all special effects involving fire, smoke, and explosions were filmed at Post Studios.

Writing
Producers recruited British science fiction writer Nigel Kneale to write the original screenplay, mostly because Carpenter admired his Quatermass series. Kneale said his script did not include "horror for horror's sake". He adds, "The main story had to do with deception, psychological shocks rather than physical ones." Kneale asserts that movie mogul Dino De Laurentiis, owner of the film's distribution rights, did not care for it and ordered more graphic violence and gore. While much of the plot remained the same, the alterations displeased Kneale, and he requested that his name be removed from the credits. Director Tommy Lee Wallace was then assigned to revise the script. He explained in the interview the direction that Carpenter and Hill wanted to take the Halloween series, stating, "It is our intention to create an anthology out of the series, sort of along the lines of Night Gallery, or The Twilight Zone, only on a much larger scale, of course." Each year, a new film would be released that focused on some aspect of the Halloween season.

Hill told Fangoria that the film was supposed to be "a 'pod' movie, not a 'knife' movie." As such, Wallace drew inspiration from another pod film: Don Siegel's Invasion of the Body Snatchers (1956). The fictional town of Santa Mira was originally the setting of Invasion of the Body Snatchers and named as such in Halloween III as an homage to Siegel's film. Aspects of the plot proved very similar as well, such as the "snatching" bodies and replacing them with androids. Halloween III'''s subtitle comes from George A. Romero's second film Season of the Witch (1973)—also known as Hungry Wives—but the plot contains no similarity to Romero's story of a housewife who becomes involved in witchcraft.

Casting
The cast of Halloween III: Season of the Witch consisted mostly of character actors whose previous acting credits included cameo appearances on various television series. The exceptions were Tom Atkins and veteran actor Dan O'Herlihy. Cast as surgeon Daniel "Dan" Challis, Atkins had appeared in several John Carpenter films prior to Halloween III. Atkins played Nick Castle in The Fog (1980) and Rehme in Escape from New York (1981). Atkins guest starred in television series such as Harry O, The Rockford Files and Lou Grant. Atkins told Fangoria that he liked being the hero. As a veteran horror actor, he added, "I wouldn't mind making a whole career out of being in just horror movies." After Halloween III, Atkins continued to play supporting roles in dozens of films and television series.

Stacey Nelkin co-starred as Ellie Grimbridge, a young woman whose father is murdered by Silver Shamrock. She landed the role after a make-up artist working on the film told her about the auditions. In an interview, Nelkin commented on her character: "Ellie was very spunky and strong-minded. Although I like to think of myself as having these traits, she was written that way in the script." Nelkin considered it an "honor" to be playing Jamie Lee Curtis's successor. According to Roger Ebert, Nelkin's performance was the "one saving grace" in the film. Ebert explained, "She has one of those rich voices that makes you wish she had more to say and in a better role . ... Too bad she plays her last scene without a head." Prior to her role as Grimbridge, Nelkin was one of the main characters in the 1980 Mad Magazine movie Up the Academy, which also starred Ralph Macchio. After Halloween III, Nelkin continued working as a character actress on television.

Veteran Irish actor Dan O'Herlihy was cast as Conal Cochran, the owner of Silver Shamrock and the witch from the film's title (a 3000-year-old demon in Kneale's original script). O'Herlihy had played close to 150 roles before co-starring as the Irish trickster and was nominated for an Academy Award for his performance in The Adventures of Robinson Crusoe (1954). He appeared in another twenty films and television series before his death in 2005. O'Herlihy admitted in an interview with Starlog magazine that he was not particularly impressed with the finished film. When asked what he thought of working in the horror film, O'Herlihy responded, "Whenever I use a Cork accent, I'm having a good time, and I used a Cork accent in [Halloween III]. I thoroughly enjoyed the role, but I didn't think it was much of a picture, no." Two members of the supporting cast were not strangers to the Halloween series. Nancy Kyes played Challis's ex-wife Linda; she had appeared in the first two Halloween films as Laurie Strode's promiscuous friend Annie Brackett. Stunt performer Dick Warlock makes a cameo appearance as an android assassin. Warlock had earlier co-starred as Michael Myers in Halloween II. Jamie Lee Curtis also provided uncredited voice work as the Santa Mira curfew announcer and the telephone operator. Tommy Lee Wallace also provided uncredited voice work as the Silver Shamrock Commercial Announcer.

Directing
Joe Dante was originally hired to direct but quit in order to direct a segment of Twilight Zone: The Movie just weeks before principal photography was scheduled to start on April 19, 1982. The film was the directorial debut of Tommy Lee Wallace, although he was not a newcomer to the Halloween series. Wallace had served as art director and production designer for John Carpenter's original Halloween and he had previously declined to direct Halloween II in 1981. After Halloween III, Wallace directed other horror films such as Fright Night Part 2 (1988), Vampires: Los Muertos (2002) and the miniseries It (1990), the television adaptation of the Stephen King novel. Despite disagreements between Wallace and original script writer Nigel Kneale, the actors reported that Wallace was a congenial director to work with. Stacey Nelkin told one interviewer, "The shoot as a whole was fun, smooth and a great group of people to work with. Tommy Lee Wallace was incredibly helpful and open to discussion on dialogue or character issues."

Although the third film departed from the plot of the first two films, Wallace attempted to connect all three films together through certain stylistic themes. The film's opening title features a digitally animated jack-o'-lantern, an obvious reference to the jack-o'-lanterns that appeared in the opening titles of Halloween and Halloween II. Wallace's jack-o'-lantern is also the catalyst in the Silver Shamrock commercials that activates the masks. Another stylistic reference to the original film is found in the scene where Dr. Challis tosses a mask over a security camera, making the image on the monitor seem to be peering through the eye holes. This is a nod to the scene in which a young Michael Myers murders his sister while wearing a clown mask. Finally, the film contains a brief reference to its predecessors by including a few short scenes from Halloween in a television commercial that advertises the airing of the film for that upcoming holiday as a minor story within a story.

Wallace's use of gore served a different purpose than in Halloween II. According to Tom Atkins, "The effects in this [film] aren't bloody. They're more bizarre than gross." Special effects and makeup artist Tom Burman concurred, stating in an interview, "This movie is really not out to disgust people. It's a fun movie with a lot of thrills in it; not a lot of random gratuitous gore." Many of the special effects were meant to emphasize the theme of the practical joke that peppers the plot. New York Times film critic Vincent Canby notes, "The movie features a lot of carefully executed, comically horrible special effects . ... " Canby stood as one of the few critics of the time to praise Wallace's directing: "Mr. Wallace clearly has a fondness for the clichés he is parodying and he does it with style."

Music

The soundtrack was composed by John Carpenter and Alan Howarth, who worked together on the score for Halloween II and several other films. Music remained an important element in establishing the atmosphere of Halloween III. Just as in Halloween and Halloween II, there was no symphonic score. Much of the music was composed to solicit "false startles" from the audience.

The score of Halloween III differed greatly from the familiar main theme of the original and sequel. Carpenter replaced the familiar 10/8 piano melody with an electronic theme (9/16 against a steady 4/4) played on a synthesizer with beeping tonalities. Howarth explains how he and Carpenter composed the music for the third film:

The music style of John Carpenter and myself has further evolved in this film soundtrack by working exclusively with synthesizers to produce our music. This has led to a certain procedural routine. The film is first transferred to a time coded video tape and synchronized to a 24 track master audio recorder; then while watching the film we compose the music to these visual images. The entire process goes quite rapidly and has "instant gratification", allowing us to evaluate the score in synch to the picture. This is quite an invaluable asset.

One of the more memorable aspects of the film's soundtrack was the jingle from the Silver Shamrock Halloween mask commercial. Set to the tune of "London Bridge Is Falling Down", the commercial in the film counts down the number of days until Halloween beginning with day eight followed by an announcer's voice (Tommy Lee Wallace) encouraging children to purchase a Silver Shamrock mask to wear on Halloween night:

ReceptionHalloween III: Season of the Witch received generally negative reviews. The New York Times reviewer Vincent Canby struggled to apply a definite label to the film's content. He remarks, "Halloween III manages the not easy feat of being anti-children, anti-capitalism, anti-television and anti-Irish all at the same time." On the other hand, he says that the film "is probably as good as any cheerful ghoul could ask for." Other critics were far more decisive in their assessments. Roger Ebert of the Chicago Sun-Times wrote that the film was "a low-rent thriller from the first frame. This is one of those Identikit movies, assembled out of familiar parts from other, better movies." However, he did praise Stacey Nelkin's performance. Cinefantastique magazine called the film a "hopelessly jumbled mess". Jason Paul Collum points to the absence of Michael Myers and the film's nihilistic ending as reasons why the film dissatisfied reviewers and audiences alike. Jim Harper called Wallace's plot "deeply flawed." Harper argues, "Any plot dependent on stealing a chunk of Stonehenge and shipping it secretly across the Atlantic is going to be shaky from the start." He noted, "there are four time zones across the United States, so the western seaboard has four hours to get the fatal curse-inducing advertisement off the air. Not a great plan." Harper was not the only critic unimpressed by the plot. Roger Ebert wrote, "What's [Cochran's] plan? Kill the kids and replace them with robots? Why?"

Tom Milne of Time Out offered a more positive review, calling the title "a bit of a cheat, since the indestructible psycho of the first two films plays no part here." Unlike other critics, Milne thought the new plot was refreshing: "With the possibilities of the characters [of the previous Halloween films] well and truly exhausted, Season of the Witch turns more profitably to a marvellously ingenious Nigel Kneale tale of a toymaker and his fiendish plan to restore Halloween to its witch cult origins." Although Milne was unhappy that Kneale's original script was reduced to "a bit of a mess", he still believed the end result was "hugely enjoyable".

On Rotten Tomatoes the film holds a 48% approval rating and an average rating of 5.2/10, based on 33 reviews. The site's consensus reads, "Its laudable deviation from series formula not withstanding, Halloween III: Season Of The Witch offers paltry thrills and dubious plotting." On Metacritic it has a score of 50% based on reviews from 11 critics, indicating "mixed or average reviews".PopMatters journalist J. C. Maçek III wrote that the film "features no serial killers or slashers of any kind ... Still, this could have been somewhat interesting, or at least not condemnable, had the film been any good. It's not. Almost every time it starts to get to the point where we might actually become engrossed in the film, director Tommy Lee Wallace throws in something corny like ... oh, like a human decapitation scene that shows just how much the producers invested in latex. Seriously, could the special effects look a little more fake, please? I was just getting to the point where I could almost tell the robots from the real people ... making a real person look faker than Michael Jackson's nose blissfully confuses me all over again."

Academics find the film full of critiques of late 20th-century American society; historian Nicholas Rogers points to an anti-corporate message where an otherwise successful businessman turns "oddly irrational" and seeks to "promote a more robotic future for commerce and manufacture." Cochran's "astrological obsessions or psychotic hatred of children overrode his business sense." Tony Williams argues that the film's plot signified the results of the "victory of patriarchal corporate control." In a similar vein, Martin Harris writes that Halloween III contains "an ongoing, cynical commentary on American consumer culture." Upset over the commercialization of the Halloween holiday, Cochran uses "the very medium he abhors as a weapon against itself." Harris also discusses other big business critiques in the film, including the unemployment of local workers and the declining quality of mass-produced products.

Box officeHalloween III: Season of the Witch opened in 1,297 theaters in the United States on October 22, 1982, and earned $6,333,259 in its opening weekend. Like its predecessor, the film was distributed through Universal by Italian producer Dino De Laurentiis. It grossed a total of $14,400,000 in the United States, but was the worst performing Halloween film at the time. Several other horror films that premiered in 1982 performed far better, including Poltergeist ($76,606,280), Friday the 13th Part III ($34,581,519), and Creepshow ($21,028,755).

Artwork
In 1983, Edd Riveria, designer of the film's theatrical poster, received a Saturn Award nomination from the Academy of Science Fiction, Fantasy & Horror Films, USA, for Best Poster Art, but lost to John Alvin's E.T.: The Extra-Terrestrial (1982) artwork. Riveria's poster art featured a demonic face descending on three trick-or-treaters. His artwork was later featured on the cover of Fangoria in October 1982. The stylized face on the theatrical poster is actually a distorted image of the witch mask which appears in the film.  The image of the trick-or-treaters is similar to a shot in the movie that shows children in Phoenix, Arizona walking in silhouette with a red sunset in the background.

Merchandising
As part of a merchandising campaign, the producers requested Don Post to mass-produce the skull, witch, and jack-o'-lantern masks. Producers had given exclusive merchandising rights to Post as part of his contract for working on the film, and Post Studios had already successfully marketed tie-in masks for the classic Universal Monsters, Planet of the Apes (1968), Star Wars (1977), and E.T.: The Extra-Terrestrial (1982). Post used the original molds for the masks in the film to mass-produce masks for retail sale. He speculated, "Because the masks are so significant to the movie, they could become a cult item, with fans wanting to wear them when they go to see the movie." Post also gave mask-making demonstrations for a Universal Studio tour in Hollywood. The masks retailed for $25 when they finally appeared in stores. In October 2019, NECA announced that they would be releasing three 8" action figures of The Pumpkin, Witch, and Skull, which were released in March 2020.

Home mediaHalloween III was later released on VHS, Capacitance Electronic Disc,  and LaserDisc in 1983 by MCA/Universal Home Video and by Goodtimes Home Video in 1996. DVD versions were distributed by Goodtimes in 1998, Universal in 2002, and as a two-disc "Universal double feature" with Halloween II in 2007. The film was released on Blu-ray for the first time on September 18, 2012 from Shout! Factory, containing the same special features as their collector's edition DVD, which are a commentary, documentary, trailers, and still galleries. Universal released a Blu-ray release of the film on August 11, 2015. An Ultra HD Blu-ray release was released under Shout!'s Scream Factory label on October 5, 2021.

Novelization
The script was adapted as a paperback novelization in 1982 by horror writer Dennis Etchison, who also wrote the novelization of Halloween II, writing under the pseudonym Jack Martin. The book was reissued in 1984. Although Cochran appears to die in the film, the novelization implies that he may have survived, with the magic of Stonehenge transporting him away. While the film leaves open the question of whether Challis was able to get the third network to pull the deadly Silver Shamrock ad, the book conclusively states that he failed as the children die screaming.

Legacy
In the 2011 film Livide, a trio of trick-or-treaters wearing the three mask designs from Halloween III walk past a car in which one passenger sings the Silver Shamrock jingle.

In the 2014 American film The Guest, the final battle takes place inside of a high school decorated for Halloween with some decorations based on the masks from Halloween III hanging up on a wall.

In the 2018 Halloween film, a trio of trick-or-treaters are briefly shown wearing the three mask designs from Halloween III. The masks reappear in Halloween Kills, this time with attached Silver Shamrock medallions visible on the rear of the masks.

The German speed metal group Helloween, which used Halloween-themed imagery, adapted the "Silver Shamrock" ditty from the film, using it as an introduction in their 1985 debut full-length studio album Walls of Jericho.

References

Further reading

 
 
 
 
 
 
 
 
 
 "The Mask Factor" by Michael Gingold, Fangoria magazine #317, October 2012, pages 60–62. Interview of Stacey Nelkin regarding her role in the film, Halloween III: Season of the Witch'', conducted at the 2011 Monster-Mania Con, New Jersey. Three-page article has seven photos, four of Nelkin, one of her taken at the Con.

External links

 
 
 
 
 

1982 films
1982 horror films
1980s science fiction horror films
1980s supernatural horror films
American science fiction horror films
American supernatural horror films
Android (robot) films
Films about alcoholism
Films about mass murder
Films about witchcraft
Films directed by Tommy Lee Wallace
Films produced by Debra Hill
Films produced by John Carpenter
Films scored by John Carpenter
Films scored by Alan Howarth (composer)
Films set in 1982
Films set in California
Films set in Los Angeles
Films set in Louisiana
Films set in Nebraska
Films set in New York City
Films set in Ohio
Films set in Phoenix, Arizona
Films set in Seattle
Films set in Maricopa County, Arizona
Films shot in California
3
Murder–suicide in films
Techno-horror films
Universal Pictures films
1982 directorial debut films
1980s English-language films
Mad scientist films
Robot films
Films about children
1980s American films